Elizabeth Kopelman Borgwardt (born 1965) is an American historian, and lawyer.

Life
She graduated from Cambridge University with a BA and M.Phil., from Harvard Law School, with a J.D., and from Stanford University with a Ph.D. 
She worked as a mediator and arbitrator, and was a senior fellow at the Center for Conflict and Negotiation at Stanford University.
She also worked on the Michael Dukakis 1988 presidential campaign.
On  June 26, 1993, she married Kurt Borgwardt.
She teaches at Washington University in St. Louis.

Fellowships
 Spring 2012 University of Chicago, Richard and Ann Pozen Professor of Human Rights (Visiting) 
 2010 Visiting Fellow, Center for Advanced Study in the Behavioral Sciences, Stanford University
 2009 Fulbright Visiting Professor, University of Heidelberg, Center for American Studies 
 Spring 2008, Fulbright Distinguished Lecturer, University of Heidelberg, Center for American Studies 
 2004-2012 Distinguished Lecturer, Organization of American Historians
 2003-2004 Visiting Scholar, Center for the Study of Law & Society, University of California at Berkeley
 2001-2002 Samuel Golieb Fellow in Legal History, New York University School of Law
 1999 Stuart L. Bernath Dissertation Research Grant 
 1998 Ford Foundation "Human Rights" Fellow

Awards and honors
 2010 James E. McCleod Faculty Appreciation Award, Washington University in St. Louis 
 November 2010 Distinguished Graduate Award, Noble & Greenough School 
 2009 Stuart L. Bernath Lecture Prize, Society of Historians of American Foreign Relations 
 2008 Gustavus Myers Center for the Study of Bigotry and Human Rights Outstanding Book Award 
 2006 Murle Curti Book Award, the Organization of American Historians 
 2006 Stuart L. Bernath Book Prize (co-winner), the Society for Historians of American Foreign Relations 
 2006 Best Book Award, Any Historical Topic, Phi Alpha Theta History Honor Society 
 2006 Merle Curti Award
 2006 Robert F. Kennedy Foundation Book Award Finalist 
 2006 Gustavus Myers Center Outstanding Book Award, Honorable Mention, for A New Deal for the World
 2006 Nominee, Pulitzer Prize in History, for A New Deal for the World
 2004 Elizabeth Spilman Rosenfield Dissertation Prize, Stanford University Department of History
 1998 Littleton-Griswold Dissertation Research Award for Legal History, American Historical Association

Works

References

1965 births
21st-century American historians
American lawyers
Harvard Law School alumni
Stanford University alumni
Stanford Law School faculty
Washington University in St. Louis faculty
Alumni of the University of Cambridge
Living people
American women historians
American women lawyers
American women legal scholars
American legal scholars
21st-century American women